Flora Samuel is a British architect, author and academic. In 2009 she became the Head of the School of Architecture at Sheffield University, the first woman to hold the post. Prior to this, she worked for ten years at the Welsh School of Architecture, Cardiff. She was educated at Cambridge University.

Samuel is currently Professor of Architecture in the Built Environment at the University of Reading, where she helped set up a new industry-led architecture school in close collaboration with construction. She was appointed as the first RIBA Vice President for Research in 2018.

Publications
 "Le Corbusier: Architect and Feminist", Wiley-Academy, 2004,  
 "Le Corbusier in Detail", Architectural Press, 2007, 
 "Le Corbusier and the Architectural Promenade", Birkhauser, 2010,  
Flora Samuel, 2018, Why Architects Matter: Evidencing and Communicating the Value of Architects (London, Routledge)
Anne Dye and Flora Samuel, Demystifying Architectural Research (London: RIBA Enterprises, 2015)

References

External links
 Profile page at Sheffield University
Byron Kinnaird and Susie Ashworth, "In Conversation ... Flora Samuel," Parlour, 2 November 2018.

Living people
British women architects
Academics of Cardiff University
Academics of the University of Sheffield
Architecture academics
21st-century British architects
Year of birth missing (living people)